The 2017 season was Surrey Stars' second season, in which they competed in the Women's Cricket Super League, a Twenty20 competition. The side finished second in the group stage, winning four of their five matches, therefore progressing to the semi-final. However, they lost to eventual winners Western Storm in the semi-final by 3 wickets.

The side was captained by Nat Sciver and coached by Richard Bedbrook. They played their home matches at The Oval.

Squad
Surrey Stars' 15-player squad is listed below. Age given is at the start of Surrey Stars' first match of the season (13 August 2017).

Women's Cricket Super League

Season standings

 Advanced to the Final.
 Advanced to the Semi-final.

League stage

Semi-final

Statistics

Batting

Bowling

Fielding

Wicket-keeping

References

Surrey Stars seasons
2017 in English women's cricket